The Arrondissement of Oudenaarde is one of the six administrative arrondissements in the Province of East Flanders, Belgium. It is both an administrative and a judicial arrondissement. However, the Judicial Arrondissement of Oudenaarde also comprises the municipalities of Geraardsbergen, Herzele, Sint-Lievens-Houtem and Zottegem in the Arrondissement of Aalst.

Municipalities
The Administrative Arrondissement of Oudenaarde consists of the following municipalities:

 Brakel
 Horebeke
 Kluisbergen
 Kruisem
 Lierde

 Maarkedal
 Oudenaarde
 Ronse
 Wortegem-Petegem
 Zwalm

Per 1 January 2019, the municipalities of Kruishoutem and Zingem merged into the new municipality of Kruisem.

Oudenaarde